Ormetica sicilia is a moth of the family Erebidae. It was described by Herbert Druce in 1884. It is found in Mexico and Panama.

References

Ormetica
Moths described in 1884
Arctiinae of South America